The 48th Women's Boat Race took place on 21 March 1993. The contest was between crews from the Universities of Oxford and Cambridge and held as part of the Henley Boat Races along a two-kilometre course.

Background
The first Women's Boat Race was conducted on The Isis in 1927.

Race
Oxford were stroked by Phoebe White, an Under-23 international sculler. Oxford initially took the lead but were overtaken by Cambridge after a minute who were warned by the umpire for taking Oxford's water. Cambridge increased their lead and won by  lengths in a time of 6 minutes 10 seconds taking the cumulative wins to 31 to Cambridge and 17 for Oxford. The Cambridge reserve boat won by  lengths in a time of 6 minutes 22 seconds taking the cumulative wins to 16 for Cambridge and 6 for Oxford.

References

External links
 Official website

Women's Boat Race
1993 in English sport
Boat
March 1993 sports events in the United Kingdom
1993 in women's rowing
1993 sports events in London